Echelon is a 3-D science fiction flight simulator video game developed by Saint Petersburg developers MADia Entertainment. It was published in Russia by Buka Entertainment, and in all other territories by Bethesda Softworks.

Gameplay

It involves flying futuristic fighters in combat scenarios. The game can be played locally or on a local area network with up to 32 players. The Russian version of the game is called "Шторм" ("Storm"). Operation: Matriarchy (also developed by MADia) takes place in the same continuity as Echelon.

Plot
In the game, you decide the fate of the entire Galactic Federation. The aggressors from the planet Velian, having new weapons that make them almost invincible, are trying to destroy the Federation and capture all of its colonies. The Velians are ruthless to those who are trying to get in their way. They calmly burn entire planets if they show resistance.
The player will have to go from the cadet of the Training Center of the Air Force of the Federation to one of the best Air Force aces, who is assigned the most difficult tasks.

Development
The game went gold on April 27, 2001. The game was originally called Storm but that name later proved unavailable. Pete Hines(Bethesda's director of marketing and public relations) and Bethesda's Todd Vaughn were given the task of renaming the game. One morning Todd came to Hine's desk and said, 'How about Echelon?' They liked the military reference and it just sounded cool, so they went with it, hoping there would be no conflicts. The name idea was sent to Brent Erickson, who was VP of development at Bethesda West the company's subsidiary that developed the Bethesda racing titles for a number of years. Erickson liked the name.

Reception

Echelon received mixed reviews from critics. The game holds a 70% rating on Metacritic.

Jim Preston reviewed the PC version of the game for Next Generation, rating it three stars out of five, and stated that "Credit to Buka for trying to combined two genres, but predictably it neither soars nor crashes."

Steve Butts of IGN rated the game a 7.2 of 10 saying "In all Echelon is a very welcome addition to the flight sim genre. It takes an approach that most other developers have neglected. Still, the execution and design aren't entirely up to the possibility of the concept. You'll play it, you'll enjoy and, ultimately, put it aside for more traditional games that offer a lot more sparkle."

GameSpot rated the game a 7 of 10 saying In spite of its problems, Echelon does hit close enough to the mark to offer some fast and flashy, but ultimately shallow, thrills.

Awards
Echelon was nominated as "Sci-Fi Simulation Game of the Year" by GameSpot, 2001.

The game was awarded game of the month by the company Matrox.

Sequel

A sequel, Echelon: Wind Warriors, was released in 2002. The game received mixed reviews on Metacritic.

Controversy

There was controversy regarding the U.S release of the game in which Bethesda refused to pay MADia for boxed sales of the game.

References

External links

2001 video games
Bethesda Softworks games
Combat flight simulators
Windows games
Windows-only games
Video games developed in Russia
Military science fiction video games
Multiplayer online games
Science fiction video games
Buka Entertainment games
Multiplayer and single-player video games